The rufous-bellied bush tyrant (Myiotheretes fuscorufus) is a species of bird in the family Tyrannidae. It is found in the eastern Andes of Peru and Bolivia. Its natural habitats are subtropical or tropical moist montane forests and heavily degraded former forest.

References

rufous-bellied bush tyrant
Birds of the Peruvian Andes
Birds of the Bolivian Andes
rufous-bellied bush tyrant
rufous-bellied bush tyrant
rufous-bellied bush tyrant
Taxonomy articles created by Polbot